Established in 1998, ECTA is the leading pan-European telecoms association promoting market liberalisation and competition in the European communications sector, fostering ‘competition and open access’ and developing policy by representing ‘new entrant’ interests to European institutions and Government bodies.  ECTA seeks to create confidence for investors through clear and consistent regulation to unlock the growth potential of Europe’s businesses.

ECTA represents more than 100 companies, including leaders in the following market segments throughout Europe:

1. Alternative providers of consumer broadband and triple-play
First to launch Internet dial-up
First to launch triple play, first to launch high speed broadband ADSL2+
Early/Major investors in FttP (FttB/H)

2. Providers of pan-European/global services to businesses
First to launch IP-VPN, first to launch Ethernet services
Early/Major investors in FttP (FttO)

3. Challenger mobile/wireless network operators and service providers

ECTA members are some of the primary innovators in implementation of advanced telecommunications and broadband services

History
The European Competitive Telecommunications Association was formed in 1998 by Robert J. Dombkowski and Elizabeth J. Schumacher, the married couple who were founders of MCN, UK, and members of the Institute of Telecom resellers in Europe which, under the leadership of Barrington Roy Schiller had brought together a group of telecommunications resellers and suppliers in Europe in order to benefit from deregulation of the telecommunications market across Western and Eastern Europe. The founding members included high ranking executives of the major telecom players in Europe including Nick Jeffries of Cable and Wireless,  Michael Potter venture capitalist of Paradigm Ventures specialized in telecom start-ups and film director of Orphans of Apollo, Hans Gerber of SITA-Equant, Gustav Schaefer of Unisource Carrier Services, Ian Ashby of Lucent Technologies, Claude Simpson, the president of Immix Telecom (ECTA Member of the Year, 1999), Holland Taylor of USA GlobalLink, and Michael Rhodes of Coudert Brothers.

Prior to 1987, (False) the European telecommunications market consisted predominantly of monopolies or telecommunications organizations (TO's) such as BT, France Telecom and Deutsche Telekom.  In 1987, the European Union adopted the 1987 Green Paper that essentially stated it was in Europe's best interests to overhaul the current system and liberalize telecommunications services. As a result, from 1988 to 1998 the European Commission adopted multiple directives that obligated member states to open markets for equipment, telecom services, value-added, data services, satellite, mobile and voice to competition.

Member States set up national regulatory agencies (NRA's) that oversaw these directives and developed policies and procedures for telecommunications organizations to follow. The directives provided a framework for the EU commission to ensure compliance and take judicial action when necessary. In 1990 the Open Network Provision (ONP) Framework Directive was adopted by the EU that established regulations for open access to the existing infrastructure and networks, interconnection and 'fair pricing' for resellers.

ECTA was established as a result of restrictive practices by former monopolies to limit activities by resellers to access networks and obtain fair pricing. Committees were established within the organization to collectively respond to new EU directives and written and 'unwritten' policies that were carried out by NRA's.  ECTA responded to numerous proposed directives and called for regulations to be developed to better protect reseller interests and encourage enforcement in the spirit of the original 1987 Green Paper. ECTA has contributed white papers and had input into many policy telecom policies since its inception in 1997.

ECTA also serves as a forum for carriers and resellers to meet and discuss openly issues that are in the interests of the parties. ECTA has also served to educate the telecommunications market, providing information and market research on European telecommunications as well as a market forum for new products and services.

Aims and objectives
Assist and encourage market liberalisation and competition
Represent the telecommunications industry to key government and regulatory bodies 
Maintain a forum for networking and business development throughout Europe 
Assist new market entrants through pro-competitive policies 
Continually reflect the dynamic nature of the telecommunications industry

Core principles

Consumers are best protected by competition 
Service development is driven by consumer choice  
Regulation should create confidence  
Tariffs should be reasonable and straightforward  
Regulators should not pick winners or losers  
Incumbents must not be allowed to prevent competition 
Pan-European solutions are needed for Pan-European problems

Board of directors 2016
 Gijs Phoelich, General Counsel & Company Secretary, Eurofiber Netherlands BV (Chairman)
 Martin Witt, CEO, 1&1 Telecommunication SE (Vice Chairman)
 Antonis Tzortzakakis, Chief Fixed Telephony Officer & New Business, WIND Hellas Telecommunications, S.A (Treasurer)
 Antonello Conte, Board Member, AIIP
 Emmanuel Forest, Executive Vice President Institutional Affairs, Bouygues Telecom
 Ilse van der Haar, Group Head of Regulatory Affairs, Tele2 AB
 Jacek Nieweglowski, Chief Strategy Officer, PLAY
 Massimo La Rovere, Head of Regulatory, Antitrust and EU Affairs, Wind Telecomunicazioni SpA
 Tiziana Talevi, Director Regulatory Affairs, Fastweb SpA

ECTA holds two events a year to discuss the latest developments in electronic communications and digital issues as a whole. The list of past ECTA events and conferences can be found on their website.

In March 2015, ECTA sponsored a conference in presence of Vice-President of the European Commission Andrus Ansip. The title of this conference was "Creating Europe’s Digital Highways: Competition, Innovation and Investment in High-speed Broadband". The statements of the speakers as well as their video interviews including the speech from Marvin Ammori from the Centre for Internet and Society at Stanford Law School can be found on  website.

The current priority of the European Commission is to foster investments in telecom infrastructures in order to build a Connected Digital Single Market. Vice-President Andrus Ansip, released on 6 May with Commissioner Günther Oettinger a Digital Single Market Strategy which ECTA CEOs welcomed in an open letter.

More about ECTA and ECTA's role in moulding the European telecommunications market can be found on their website website.

References

External links 
 European Monitoring Centre on Change
 Empirex joins ECTA
 What does ECTA mean?

International telecommunications
Telecommunications in Europe
Technology trade associations